The Irish League in season 1930–31 comprised 14 teams, with Glentoran winning the championship.

League standings

Results

References
Northern Ireland - List of final tables (RSSSF)

NIFL Premiership seasons
North
Football
Football
1930–31 in Northern Ireland association football